Boom Boom Baby is an album by Billy "Crash" Craddock. The songs were released in the late 1950s and early 1960s. The CD was released in 1992 on Bear Family Records. The only hit song in the United States was "Don't Destroy Me". The song made it to #94 on the pop charts in November 1959. A few of the songs were hits in Australia. The songs "LuLu Lee" and "Ah, Poor Little Baby" were released on Date Records in 1958. The other tracks were released on Columbia Records in 1959-1961.

Track listing
 "Sweetie Pie"
 "Lulu Lee"
 "Ah, Poor Little Baby"
 "I Miss You So Much"
 "(For The Last Time) Am I to Be the One" (B.W. Stevenson, Otis Blackwell)
 "Well Don't You Know" (George Weston)
 "Boom Boom Baby" (Dave Burgess)
 "(What Makes You) Treat Me Like You Do" 
 "I Want That" (Ben Weisman)
 "Little Ole You"
 "One Last Kiss" (Charles Strouse, Lee Adams)
 "Report Card Of Love"
 "Heavenly Love"
 "Good Time Billy (Is a Happiness Fool)" (Peter Udell)
 "Letter of Love"
 "Don't Destroy Me"
 "Blabbermouth"
 "School Day Dreams"
 "Since She Turned Seventeen" (Wayne Walker, Marijohn Wilkin)
 "All I Want Is You" (Jamie Chaleff)
 "Is It True or False (That I'm in Love With You)"

Personnel
Billy "Crash" Craddock - guitar, vocals
Harold Bradley - guitar
Boots Randolph - saxophone
Patrick Sullivan - guitar
Grady Martin - guitar
Wally Richardson - guitar
Frank Carroll - bass
Buddy Harman - drums
Floyd Cramer - piano
Jack Tysinger Jr. - drums
Walter Garland - guitar
Jack Parrish - guitar
Hank Garland - guitar
Joe Zinkan - bass
Basil Henry Freeman Jr. - saxophone
Howard Carpenter - violin
Lillian Hunt - violin
Douglas G. Kirkman - drums
Bob Moore - bass
Andrew L. Goodrich - saxophone
A. Beasley Group - choir
Brenton Banks - violin
Solie Fott - violin

Hits (In Australia)

See also
Billy "Crash" Craddock
List of number-one singles in Australia during the 1960s

1992 compilation albums
Billy "Crash" Craddock compilation albums